2016 Shenzhen Open may refer to:
2016 ATP Shenzhen Open, an ATP World Tour tennis tournament
2016 WTA Shenzhen Open, a WTA Tour tennis tournament

See also  
 2016 Shenzhen Open – doubles (disambiguation)
 2016 Shenzhen Open – singles (disambiguation)